Piotr Piekarski (born 10 April 1964 in Brusy) is a retired Polish middle distance runner who specialized in the 800 metres.

International competitions

1Disqualified in the semifinals

References

1964 births
Living people
People from Brusy
Sportspeople from Pomeranian Voivodeship
Polish male middle-distance runners
Olympic athletes of Poland
Athletes (track and field) at the 1992 Summer Olympics
World Athletics Championships athletes for Poland
European Athletics Championships medalists
Zawisza Bydgoszcz athletes
20th-century Polish people